Talavar-e Seh (also Romanized as Talāvar-e Seh; also known as Talāvar and Ţalāvar-e ‘Olyā) is a village in Seydun-e Shomali Rural District, Seydun District, Bagh-e Malek County, Khuzestan Province, Iran. At the 2006 census, its population was 501, in 83 families.

References 

Populated places in Bagh-e Malek County